Urquhart and Logie Wester is a parish within the county of Ross and Cromarty, Scotland. It is situated in the area known as the Black Isle and is in the Highland (council area).

History

The parishes of Urquhart and Logiebride were united to form one parish in 1845. Logiebride forms the western half of the parish hence Logie Wester, and Urquhart forms the eastern half. Both Urquhart and Logiebride previously had their own parish churches, both of which are now in ruins. However today there are several more modern churches in the parish of Urquhart and Logie Wester. The Battle of Logiebride took place in 1597.

A medieval parish and a parish for civil and religious purposes from the sixteenth century until 1975. The boundaries of the civil parish were altered by the Boundary Commissioners in 1891.
The largest village within the parish is Conon Bridge. Other settlements within the parish include the village Easter Kinkell, the hamlet Bishop Kinkell and the small village Culbokie.

References 

Urquhart and Logie Wester
Black Isle